Big Cypress Tree State Park is a state park in Weakley County, Tennessee, located in the Southeastern United States.  The park is named after a large and old bald cypress tree that once stood on the park's grounds.  The tree was approximately 1,350 years old when it was killed by lightning in 1976.

The park consists of a 330-acre (1.3 km²) natural area situated amidst the watershed of the Obion River.

External links
"Big Cypress Tree State Park" — official site

State parks of Tennessee
Protected areas of Weakley County, Tennessee